Manx Peak is a  mountain summit located in Jasper National Park, in the Trident Range of the Canadian Rockies of Alberta, Canada. Circus Valley lies at the south side of the mountain, and the northeast aspect towers above the head of the valley of Whistlers Creek. The peak is composed of sedimentary rock laid down from the Precambrian to the Jurassic periods and pushed east and over the top of younger rock during the Laramide orogeny.

History
The peak was named in 1916 by Morrison P. Bridgland because the shape of the contours of the mountain resemble the triskelion in the flag of the Isle of Man, the home of the Manx people. Bridgland (1878–1948), was a Dominion Land Surveyor who named many peaks in Jasper Park and the Canadian Rockies.

The first ascent of Manx Peak was made in 1919 by R.T. Chamberlin and B. Herzberg.

This mountain's toponym was officially adopted in 1951 by the Geographical Names Board of Canada.

Climate

Based on the Köppen climate classification, Manx Peak is located in a subarctic climate zone with cold, snowy winters, and mild summers. Winter temperatures can drop below  with wind chill factors below . Precipitation runoff from Manx Peak drains into tributaries of the Athabasca River.

See also

 List of mountains of Canada
 Geography of Alberta

Gallery

References

External links
 Parks Canada web site: Jasper National Park
 Manx Peak: weather

Three-thousanders of Alberta
Mountains of Jasper National Park
Canadian Rockies